Radio Tandem is a local radio of Kazakhstan operating at FM frequencies of 103.60 (Atyrau) & 104.70 (Aktobe).

External links 
 Website of Radio tandem

Radio stations in Kazakhstan
Mass media in Atyrau
Mass media in Aktobe